is a prefecture of Japan located in the Tōhoku region of Honshu. Miyagi Prefecture borders Iwate Prefecture to the north, Akita Prefecture to the northwest, Yamagata Prefecture to the west, and Fukushima Prefecture to the south.

Sendai is the capital and largest city of Miyagi Prefecture, and the largest city in the Tōhoku region, with other major cities including Ishinomaki, Ōsaki, and Tome. Miyagi Prefecture is located on Japan's eastern Pacific coast  and bounded to the west by the Ōu Mountains, the longest mountain range in Japan, with 24% of its total land area being designated as Natural Parks. Miyagi Prefecture is home to Matsushima Islands, a group of islands ranked as one of the Three Views of Japan, near the town of Matsushima.

History 

Miyagi Prefecture was formerly part of the province of Mutsu.

2011 Tōhoku earthquake and tsunami

On March 11, 2011, a 9.0 magnitude earthquake and a subsequent major tsunami hit Miyagi Prefecture, causing major damage to the area.

On April 7, 2011, a magnitude 7.4 earthquake struck off the coast of Miyagi, Japan. Workers were then evacuated from the nearby troubled Fukushima Daiichi nuclear facility once again, as a tsunami warning was issued for the coastline. Residents were told to flee for inner land at that time.

In 2013, Crown Prince Naruhito and Crown Princess Masako visited the prefecture to see the progress made since the tsunami.

Geography 

Miyagi Prefecture is in the central part of Tōhoku, facing the Pacific Ocean, and contains Tōhoku's largest city, Sendai. There are high mountains on the west and along the northeast coast, but the central plain around Sendai is fairly large.

Matsushima is known as one of the three most scenic views of Japan, with a bay full of 260 small islands covered in pine groves.

Oshika Peninsula projects from the northern coastline of the prefecture.

As of 31 March 2019, 24% of the total land area of the prefecture was designated as Natural Parks, namely the Sanriku Fukkō National Park; Kurikoma and Zaō Quasi-National Parks; and Abukuma Keikoku, Asahiyama, Funagata Renpō, Futakuchi Kyōkoku, Kenjōsan Mangokuura, Kesennuma, Matsushima, and Zaō Kōgen Prefectural Natural Parks.

Cities 

Fourteen cities are located in Miyagi Prefecture:

Towns and villages

These are the towns and villages in each district:

Mergers

Economy 
Although Miyagi has a good deal of fishing and agriculture, producing a great deal of rice and livestock, it is dominated by the manufacturing industries around Sendai, particularly electronics, appliances, and food processing.

As of March 2011, the prefecture produced 4.7% of Japan's rice, 23% of oysters, and 15.9% of sauries.

In July 2011, the Japanese government decided to ban all shipments of beef cattle from northeast Miyagi Prefecture over fears of radioactive contamination.
This has since been rescinded.

Demographics

According to Japanese census data, Miyagi prefecture experienced its greatest period of growth from 1940 to 1950 and continued to exhibit growth up until the 21st century. Nevertheless, like the majority of Japan, the population of Miyagi has begun to slowly decline. The prefectural capital of Sendai, however, has seen a moderate, but steady rise in population over the past twenty years.

Education

University 
Miyagi University
Miyagi University of Education
Miyagi Gakuin Women's University
Sendai University
Sendai Shirayuri Women's College
Tohoku University
Tohoku Gakuin University
Tohoku Bunka Gakuen University
Tohoku Institute of Technology
Tohoku Fukushi University
Tohoku Seikatsu Bunka College
Tohoku Pharmaceutical University
Shokei Gakuin University
Ishinomaki Senshu University

Transportation

Rail
JR East
Tōhoku Shinkansen
Tohoku Line
Jōban Line
Senseki Line
Senzan Line
Ishinomaki Line
Rikuu East Line
Kesennuma Line
Ōfunato Line
Sendai Municipal Subway 
 Namboku Line
 Tōzai Line
 Abukuma Express
 Sendai Airport Line

Roads

Expressways and toll roads
 Tōhoku Expressway
Yamagata Expressway
Sanriku Expressway
Sendai East Road
Sendai North Road
Sendai South Road

National highways
  (Nihonbashi of Tokyo–Kasukabe–Utsunomiya–Koriyama–Sendai–Furukawa–Ichinoseki–Morioka–Towada–Aomori)
  (Nihonbashi of Tokyo–Mito–Iwaki–Soma–Sendai)
  (Sendai–Ishinomaki–Ofunato–Kamaishi–Kuji–Hachinohe–Towada)
  (Furukawa–Narugo–Shinjyo–Sakata)
  (Sendai–Yamagata)

Ports

Sendai Port – Ferry route to Tomakomai, Hokkaido and Nagoya, container hub port
Ishinomaki Port – Ferry route to Mount Kinka and Tashiro Island.
Matsushima Bay

Airports 
Sendai Airport

Sports 

The sports teams listed below are based in Miyagi Prefecture.
Baseball
Tohoku Rakuten Golden Eagles  (Miyagi Baseball Stadium, Sendai)
Tohoku Reia
Football (soccer)
Vegalta Sendai   (Yurtec Stadium Sendai, Sendai)
Sony Sendai F.C.  (Yurtec Stadium Sendai, Sendai)
Vegalta Sendai Ladies  (Yurtec Stadium Sendai, Sendai)
Basketball
Sendai 89ERS  (Sendai Gymnasium, Sendai)
Volleyball
Sendai Bellefille
Futsal
Voscuore Sendai
Professional wrestling
Sendai Girls' Pro Wrestling

Also, the Sendai Hi-Land Raceway hosts motorsport road races.

Visitor attractions 
Sendai was the castle town of the daimyō Date Masamune. The remains of Sendai Castle stand on a hill above the city.

Miyagi Prefecture boasts one of Japan's three greatest sights. Matsushima, the pine-clad islands, dot the waters off the coast of the prefecture.

The following are also noted as attractions:

 Aoba Castle
 Ichibanchō
 Akiu Hot Spring
 Iwai Point
 Kinkasan Islet
 Matsushima Bay

 Naruko Hot Spring
 Rikuchu Coast
 Okama Crater Lake
 Zao Botanical Garden
 Zao Hot Spring

Famous festivals and events 

 Sendai New Year's traditional Sale on January 2
 Shiroishi Kokeshi Exhibition, May 3–5
 Aoba Festival, Suzume Odori traditional Japanese dance event in May
 Shiogama Port Festival in July
 Sendai Tanabata Festival, August 6–8
 Sendai Pageant of Starlight in December

Popular culture
Miyagi Prefecture is one of the main settings of the manga and anime series Haikyū!!. The most well-known fictional schools located there are Karasuno High School, Aoba Johsai High School, Date Tech High and Shiratorizawa Academy, as well as Sendai City Gymnasium. Another anime series Wake Up, Girls! is also set in Miyagi Prefecture.

Notes

References
 Nussbaum, Louis-Frédéric and Käthe Roth. (2005).  Japan encyclopedia. Cambridge: Harvard University Press. ;  OCLC 58053128
 Titsingh, Isaac. (1834). Nihon Odai Ichiran; ou,  Annales des empereurs du Japon.  Paris: Royal Asiatic Society, Oriental Translation Fund of Great Britain and Ireland. OCLC 5850691

External links 

Miyagi Prefecture Official Website 

 
Tōhoku region
Prefectures of Japan
1871 establishments in Japan